Oophagomyia plotnikovi is a species of true flies in the family Sarcophagidae.

Range
Kazakhstan.

References 

Sarcophagidae
Diptera of Asia
Insects described in 1928